Émile-Florent Lecomte (1866–1938) was a Belgian painter. His work was part of the painting event in the art competition at the 1936 Summer Olympics.

References

1866 births
1938 deaths
20th-century Belgian painters
Belgian painters
Olympic competitors in art competitions
People from Hainaut (province)